Kunkel is a surname, also spelled Künkel, for Slovak women Kunkelová. Notable people with the surname include:

Politics
George Kunkel (1893–1965), American lawyer and politician from Pennsylvania
Jacob Michael Kunkel (1822–1870), US Congressman from Maryland
John C. Kunkel (1898–1970), US Congressman from Pennsylvania
John Christian Kunkel (1816–1870), US Congressman from Pennsylvania

Science
Fritz Künkel (1889–1956), German-American psychoanalyst
Henry Kunkel (1916–1983), American immunologist
Johann von Löwenstern-Kunckel (1630–1703), German chemist
Louis M. Kunkel (born 1949), American geneticist
Louis Otto Kunkel (1884–1960), American botanist

Sports
Adam Kunkel (born 1981), Canadian hurdler
Anna Kunkel (1932–2006), American baseball player
Bill Kunkel (baseball) (1936–1985), American baseball pitcher and umpire
Jeff Kunkel (born 1961), American baseball shortstop
Karl-Heinz Kunkel (1926–1994), German footballer
Kristina Kunkel (born 1984), American water polo player
Monika Kunkelová (born 1977), Slovak wheelchair curler, 2014 and 2018 Winter Paralympian
Paul Kunkel (1903–1977), American tennis player
Peter Kunkel (born 1956), German footballer
Rachelle Kunkel (born 1978), American diver
Rainer Künkel (born 1950), German footballer

Other
Benjamin Kunkel (born 1972), American novelist and political economist
Bill Kunkel (journalist) (1950–2011), American executive editor of Electronic Games Magazine
 Bruce Kunkel, former member of the Nitty Gritty Dirt Band
Leah Kunkel (born 1948), American singer, songwriter, and attorney
Mike Kunkel, American cartoonist
Renata Kunkel (born 1954), Polish composer
Russ Kunkel (born 1948), American drummer and producer
Thomas Kunkel (born 1955), American author, journalist, and educator
Thor Kunkel (born 1963), German author

See also
People
John Kunkel Small (1869–1938), American botanist

Places
Elizabeth Kunkel House, historic site in Martinsburg, West Virginia, United States
Kunkel Gallery at the Whitaker Center for Science and the Arts in Harrisburg, Pennsylvania, United States
Kunkels Pass, mountain pass in Switzerland

Other
 Kunkle (disambiguation)

Surnames from given names